Janeese Lewis George (born April 30, 1988) is an American lawyer, politician, and activist in Washington, D.C. She is the Member of the Council of the District of Columbia from Ward 4. George is a member of the Democratic Party.

Elected in November 2020, George became the first self-described democratic socialist to serve as a member of the Council since Hilda Mason was defeated for re-election in 1998.

Early life and education
George was born in Washington, D.C., the daughter of a postal worker, and attended the School Without Walls in the Foggy Bottom neighborhood. She earned a Bachelor of Arts degree in politics and government from St. John's University. She earned a Juris Doctor from the Howard University School of Law, working as a waitress to pay her tuition.

Career
After graduating from law school, George worked as a prosecutor in Philadelphia In 2014, she returned to D.C. to care for her ailing father and served in the office of Attorney General of the District of Columbia, Karl Racine. George was a member of the American Federation of Government Employees Local 1403 while working at the Attorney General's office. As a juvenile prosecutor in DC, she used experiences from losing peers to violence during her upbringing to help her colleagues. Before launching her campaign for the Council, George worked for the District of Columbia State Board of Education.

2020 campaign
In 2019, George launched her campaign for the Council of the District of Columbia. George was the subject of attack ads by Democrats for Education Reform, an advocacy group that supports charter schools, over claims that she would defund the police. She was endorsed by a significant number of progressive groups, including Black Lives Matter, the Working Families Party and the Democratic Socialists of America.

George was the first candidate to reach the limit in matching funds through the District's public financing program since it was initiated. The program provides matching funds but limits donations to $50 per supporter, of which she had almost 1,200 by March 2020. On June 2, she defeated incumbent Brandon Todd by an 11.7-point margin. She was elected to the Council of the District of Columbia in November 2020.

Personal life
George is married to Kyle George, who she met at a high school graduation party.

Electoral history

References

External links 
 Official campaign website

1988 births
21st-century American politicians
African-American people in Washington, D.C., politics
American community activists
Howard University alumni
Living people
Democratic Socialists of America politicians from Washington, D.C.
People from Washington, D.C.
Progressivism in the United States
Washington, D.C., Democrats
21st-century African-American politicians
20th-century African-American people